The 1961 Michigan State Spartans football team represented Michigan State University in the 1961 Big Ten Conference football season. In their eighth season under head coach Duffy Daugherty, the Spartans compiled a 7–2 overall record (5–2 against Big Ten opponents), finished in third place in the Big Ten Conference, and were ranked #8 in the final AP Poll.

Two Spartans were selected as first-team players on the 1961 All-Big Ten Conference football team. Halfback George Saimes received first-team honors from the Associated Press (AP) and United Press International (UPI), and tackle Dave Behrman received first-team honors from the AP. Halfback Sherman Lewis received second-team all-conference honors from the AP. Dave Behrman also received first-team recognition from the AP and Football Writers Association of America on the 1961 College Football All-America Team.

The 1961 Spartans won all three of their annual rivalry games. In the annual Indiana–Michigan State football rivalry game, the Spartans defeated the Hoosiers by a 35 to 0 score. In the Notre Dame rivalry game, the Spartans defeated the Fighting Irish by a 17 to 7 score. And, in the annual Michigan–Michigan State football rivalry game, the Spartans defeated the Wolverines by a 28 to 0 score. In non-conference play, the Spartans also defeated Stanford, 31-3.

Schedule

Roster
 FB George Saimes, Jr.

References

Michigan State
Michigan State Spartans football seasons
Michigan State Spartans football